Waterblasting or water blasting may refer to:

Hydrocleaning, the use of high pressure water for cleaning
Hydrodemolition, the use of high pressure water to remove concrete